Germán Antonio Llanes (born Cañada Seca, 27 May 1968) is former Argentine rugby union player. He played as a lock.

Llanes played for La Plata Rugby Club, from 1986/87 to 1994/95, Mirano Rugby 1957, in Italy, in 1995/96, Bath Rugby, in England, for 1997/98, Stade Rochelais, from 1999/2000 to 2001/2002, CA Bègles-Bordeaux, in 2002/03, Stade Rochelais, once again, for 2003/04, and Stade Bordelais, in 2005/06, where he finished his career, aged 38 years old.

Llanes had 42 caps for Argentina, from 1990 to 2000, scoring 1 try, 5 points on aggregate. He was called for the 1991 Rugby World Cup, playing in two matches, and for the 1995 Rugby World Cup, playing in three matches. He never scored in both occasions.

References

External links
Germán Llanes International Statistics

1968 births
Living people
Argentine rugby union players
Argentina international rugby union players
La Plata Rugby Club players
Rugby union locks
Argentine expatriate sportspeople in France
Expatriate rugby union players in France
Argentine expatriate rugby union players
CA Bordeaux-Bègles Gironde players
Stade Rochelais players
Argentine expatriate sportspeople in England
Argentine expatriate sportspeople in Italy
Expatriate rugby union players in England
Expatriate rugby union players in Italy
Bath Rugby players
Stade Bordelais players